The Brăila Bridge is a road suspension bridge under construction in Romania over the Danube river, between Brăila, a major city in eastern Romania, and the opposite bank of the river in Tulcea County. It will be the first bridge over the maritime Danube sector and the fourth bridge over the Romanian section of the river. At nearly 2 km in length, it will be one of the longest suspension bridge in Europe. The bridge will improve road traffic accessibility of the Galați-Brăila area to Constanța and Tulcea, and connections of the Moldavia and Muntenia regions with Dobruja.

Construction

First studies for a bridge in the Lower Danube region were done in 1986, but the first prefeasibility study was conducted in 1996.

In 2017, the bridge project was awarded to the Astaldi (now Webuild) and IHI Infrastructure Systems association for an estimated cost of €434 million, and the construction works started in December 2018.

In May 2021, the construction of the two main pillars had finished, and preparations had been started to deploy the first cables across the bridge. On 20 August 2021, it was reported that the construction of the bridge is on schedule and that half of the bridge was already done.

The first of the 86 suspended segments of the roadway were installed in spring 2022, with the last one on 28 June 2022. The bridge is expected to be opened in 2023.

Specifications

See also
Roads in Romania
List of bridges in Romania
List of longest suspension bridge spans

References

External links

Presentation Memo: Suspended bridge suspended over the Danube in the Brăila area
Astaldi will build a suspension bridge over the Danube, in the Braila area in Romania
IHI Group First Order Received for Large Suspension Bridge in Romania

Proposed roads in Romania
Bridges in Romania
Bridges over the Danube
Buildings and structures in Brăila County
Buildings and structures in Tulcea County
Brăila
Suspension bridges
Road bridges